Attorney General Walsh may refer to:

Robert Walsh (Australian politician) (1824–1899), Attorney-General of Victoria
William C. Walsh (1890–1975), Attorney General of Maryland

See also
General Walsh (disambiguation)